The following is a list of the 27 cantons of the Moselle department, in France, following the French canton reorganisation which came into effect in March 2015:

 Algrange
 Bitche
 Boulay-Moselle
 Bouzonville
 Les Coteaux de Moselle
 Fameck
 Faulquemont
 Forbach
 Freyming-Merlebach
 Hayange
 Metz-1
 Metz-2
 Metz-3
 Metzervisse
 Montigny-lès-Metz
 Le Pays Messin
 Phalsbourg
 Rombas
 Saint-Avold
 Sarralbe
 Sarrebourg
 Sarreguemines
 Le Saulnois
 Le Sillon Mosellan
 Stiring-Wendel
 Thionville
 Yutz

References